Royan (formerly, ‘Alamdeh) is a city in the Central District of Nur County, in Mazandaran Province of northern Iran.
Royan is located on the southern Caspian Sea coast.

At the 2006 census, its population was 6,339, in 1,708 families.

Alamdeh was a part of east Ruyan.

References

External links

Cities in Mazandaran Province
Populated places in Nur County
Populated coastal places in Iran
Populated places on the Caspian Sea